Onceropyga is a genus of moths of the family Zygaenidae.

Species
Onceropyga anelia Turner, 1906
Onceropyga pulchra Tarmann, 2005

References

Procridinae
Zygaenidae genera